Findability Sciences is an enterprise AI, big data, and cognitive computing firm headquartered in Boston, MA. It has subsidiaries in Japan and India. Its platform helps users to build IP and data science capabilities.

History
Findability Sciences was founded by Anand Mahurkar in 2010 in Boston. In 2014, the company developed a technology for the agriculture sector. In the same year, it also appointed Darren Betz to its advisory board. In October 2017, the company formed a joint venture with Japan's Soft Bank which is managed by the company's facility in Tokyo, Japan. In March 2019, the company made a strategic investment in California-based corporate memory startup WorkDone. In September 2019, it formed a partnership with the Latin American technology consulting firm Quantum. In August 2020, Inc Magazine listed Findability Sciences as 1157 number in its list of Inc 5000. In February 2022, the company launched Findability.INSIDE.

Funding
In 2017, Findability Sciences raised $7.32 mn in its Series A round of funding led by Soft Bank.

Recognition

 2022: Small Business Administration, Boston named Findability Sciences as the Microenterprise Business of the year for Massachusetts in May 2022.
 2022: Findability Sciences was recognized for the second time on Inc. magazine’s annual Inc. 5000 list
 2022: Anand Mahurkar, Founder and CEO was awarded the International Achievers’ Award by the Indian Achievers’ Forum
 2021: The company received Honorable Mention in the ‘AI and Data Category’ of Fast Company’s World Changing Ideas Awards
 2021: Findability Sciences ranked 170th in the Financial Times and Statista list of The Americas' Fastest Growing Companies 2021
 2020: The company ranked no. 1157 on the 2020 Inc. 5000

References

External links
 Findability Sciences

Organizations based in Massachusetts
Artificial intelligence associations
Organizations established in 2014